Facedown is the debut extended play by English rock band the 1975 released on 6 August 2012 through Dirty Hit. It is the debut of four EPs released before the band's self-titled debut. Each song was accompanied by a music video. The lead single, "The City", and "Woman," were performance videos, while "Facedown" and "Antichrist" were more conceptual pieces. All videos were in black and white and directed by James Booth.

Recording 
The release of the EP was in August 2012, saw the band's first UK airplay on national radio with lead track "The City", which featured as part of a BBC Introducing show with Huw Stephens on BBC Radio 1.

On 19 May 2013, a re-recorded version of "The City" was released as a single from the band's fourth EP, titled IV. The song peaked at number 30 on the UK Singles Chart and number 27 on the Scottish Singles Chart.

Musical style 
The EP's sound was noted as "reverb-soaked guitars and emotive vocals with a distinct twang." On a call with BBC Radio 1's Huw Stephens, their manager Jamie Oborne described the single as, "Talking Heads meets M83".

Track listing

References

2012 debut EPs
The 1975 EPs